National Provincial Bank Ltd v Ainsworth [1965] is an English land law and family law case, concerning the quality of a person's interest in a home when people live together, as well as licenses in land.

The House of Lords, the court of final appeal, held that someone living in a home, who was deserted, did not by that fact alone have an interest in equity. Lord Wilberforce offered a definition of property rights, however this level of the decision was compromised, and forms heavily amended principles of law, as the concept of the constructive trust was developed further.

More widely approved has been its principles of the overturned decision in the court below: the judgment of Denning LJ (noting the concurrence by Donovan LJ) some of which were cited with approval in the House of Lords in this case also.

Facts
Mr and Mrs Ainsworth lived in Milward Road, Hastings, Sussex and had four children. Mr Ainsworth was the registered owner, but moved out in 1957, borrowed £1,000 in 1958 from the bank, and gave the bank a charge (security by mortgage) over it. The money was used for his small business, Hastings Car Mart Ltd, incorporated at the end of 1959. He had left his wife living in the home, deserting their relationship. In 1962 he (as borrower) fell behind in the payments to the bank who soon sought possession of the house and sued, bringing this action. However, Mrs Ainsworth refused to leave because she contended that she had an interest in the home that bound the bank.

Judgment

Court of Appeal
The Court of Appeal held Mrs Ainsworth had a right to occupy that bound the bank. Lord Denning MR held that the ‘deserted wife’s equity’ was capable of binding a third party like a bank. The reasons for his judgment were as follows.

Donovan LJ concurred. Russell LJ dissented.

House of Lords
The House of Lords reversed the decision of the Court of Appeal, finding that Mrs Ainsworth’s right did not count as a property right and was not capable of binding the bank.

Lord Upjohn said the following.

Lord Wilberforce noted that a deserted wife’s equity has been there partly because of a persistent post war housing shortage, and has been variously described as an equity, clog, licence or status of irremovability, and said this is all about whether despite Mrs Ainsworth’s rights against her husband, she had any against the bank. The wife, he continued,

See also
English trusts law
English land law
English family law

References

English land case law
House of Lords cases
1965 in British law
1965 in case law